Sergey Mikhaylov may refer to:
Sergey Mihaylov (born 1976), Uzbek boxer
Sergey Mikhailov (politician), Russian politician
Sergei Mikhailov (businessman) (born 1958), Russian businessman
Sergei Mikhailov (footballer, born 1963), Russian footballer
Sergey Mikhaylov (footballer, born 1978), Belarusian footballer
Sergei Mikhailov (footballer, born 1983), Russian footballer

See also
Mikhaylov (disambiguation)